Cirilli is a surname. Notable people with the surname include:

 Arthur Cirilli (1914–1995), American lawyer, politician, and judge
  (1871–1954), Italian architect
 Jean-Charles Cirilli (born 1982), French footballer